The Headquarters of the United States Department of the Army (HQDA) approved its Command Implementation Plan (CIP) to restructure the District of Columbia Army National Guard (DCARNG) Area Mobilization Command. As part of this restructure, the Mobilization Augmentation Command (MAC) received a name change as of 22 September 2016.  The new name is Multi-Agency Augmentation Command (MAC).  HQDA stated the restructure was made in order to provide flexibility and support to the DCARNG's unique state and federal missions.

The MAC is a 0-7 level Table of Distribution and Allowances (TDA) command of the District of Columbia Army National Guard and provides trained personnel for staff augmentation and operational support to Headquarters, Department of the Army, Operations Center (AOC), the Alternate Army Operations Center (AAOC), the Domestic Operations Support Division (DOMS), the National Guard Coordination Center (NGCC), ARNG Domestic Operation Center, National Guard Bureau – Legislative Liaison (NGB-LL) and other Operations Centers in support of routine, national crisis or wartime requirements.  The MAC also supports National Special Security Events and the State of the Union Address. As required, the Command provides staff capability packages to augment the District of Columbia National Guard, Joint Task Force for Domestic Support to Civil Authorities operations.

History 
The District of Columbia National Guard descends from the 25th Battalion of the Maryland Militia, Headquartered in Georgetown, Maryland, formed 1776 to fight in the American Revolutionary War.  After Congress established the Federal District in District of Columbia Organic Act of 1801, local Militia units were reorganized again, to form what would become the District of Columbia National Guard. Supervision and control of District of Columbia National Guard was delegated by the President of the United States to the Secretary of Defense pursuant to Executive Order 10030, 26 January 1949 with authority given to the Secretary to designate officials of the National Military Establishment to administer affairs of the District of Columbia National Guard. The Secretary of the Army was directed to act for the Secretary of Defense in all matters pertaining to the ground component, and the Secretary of the Air Force was directed to act in all matters pertaining to the air component of the District of Columbia National Guard by Secretary of Defense memorandum, 2 February 1949. Founded in 1997, the Mobilization Augmentation Detachment of the DC National Guard primary mission was to support the National Guard Bureau Operations Staff and Emergency Operations Center in Arlington, Virginia. On 27 September 2001, following the 9/11 terrorist attacks on America, the unit was the first Army Reserve component mobilized to support the Global War on Terrorism.  Due to the MAC's quality of performance and commitment to missions, a decision was made by the commanding general, to expand the unit into a Command, with a larger role, and opportunities for over 100 Officers and NCOs. The MAC is heavily involved in operations throughout the National Capital Region.

Current Divisions 
Army National Guard (ARNG) Operations support Division
Department of the Army (DA) Operations Support Division
Homeland Security and Emergency Management Agency (HSEMA) DC Operations
Joint Operations Support Division
National Guard Bureau (NGB) Plans and Operations Division

Commanders

References

External links 
DCNG, 2013, https://web.archive.org/web/20090531035102/http://states.ng.mil/sites/DC/Pages/DCNationalGuard.aspx
History of DCNG, 2013, https://web.archive.org/web/20150227195959/http://www.dcnationalguard.com/about.html
NGB, 2013, http://www.nationalguard.mil/
OSD, 2013, http://www.defense.gov/

Installations of the United States Army National Guard
Military in Washington, D.C.